Pascal Garnier (1949-2010) was a French writer, primarily known for his noir fiction. 

Born in Paris, Garnier quit school without obtaining a high school diploma, and after a varied and nomadic life, he decided at the age of 35 to start writing. In 1986, he wrote his first book, L'Année sabbatique, a collection of short stories. Often likened to the work of Georges Simenon, his books have been translated into many languages. Gallic Books UK have translated a dozen of his crime novels into English. John Banville praised these titles in a laudatory review in the New York Review of Books.

Garnier died in the Ardeche region in 2010

References

French writers
1949 births
2010 deaths